Euphyciodes albotessulalis is a moth in the family Crambidae. It was described by Paul Mabille in 1900. It is found on the Comoros and in Madagascar.

Subspecies
Euphyciodes albotessulalis albotessulalis
Euphyciodes albotessulalis comoralis Viette, 1960 (Comoros: Anjouan)

References

Moths described in 1900
Pyraustinae